Topsy  may refer to:

Arts and entertainment
 Topsy, a character in the novel Uncle Tom's Cabin
 Topsy, a character in the 2018 film Mary Poppins Returns
 Topsy and Eva, a 1928 film based on Uncle Tom's Cabin
 Topsy and Tim, a children's book series
 Topsy (Tom and Jerry), a character in the cartoon series Tom and Jerry
 "Topsy" (instrumental), a jazz instrumental first recorded by Count Basie, then by Benny Goodman, and later by Cozy Cole
 "Topsy" (Bob's Burgers), the 38th episode of the animated comedy series Bob's Burgers

People
 Topsy Sinden (1878–1950), an English dancer, actress, and singer
 Topsy (d.1998), an abused Chinese girl, subject of The Story of Topsy, a book by Mildred Cable

Places in the United States
 Topsy, Missouri, an unincorporated community
 Topsy, Oklahoma, a rural community also known as "Chloeta"

Other uses
 Topsy (elephant) (c. 1875–1903), a circus animal electrocuted by her owners
 Topsy (analytics), an online social media and communications insights platform
 A codename of the Mitsubishi Ki-5-II, an aircraft
 Topsy's Roost, a former restaurant and nightclub at Playland-at-the-Beach in San Francisco

See also
 Topsy-Turvy (disambiguation)